The 1926 Chicago American Giants baseball team represented the Chicago American Giants in the Negro National League (NNL) during the 1926 baseball season. The team compiled a 60–21–3 record, won the NNL pennant, and defeated the Bacharach Giants in the 1926 Colored World Series. Rube Foster was the team's owner and manager. Dave Malarcher took over as manager in the second half of the season. The team played its home games at Schorling Park in Chicago. 

The team's leading batters were:
 Right fielder Jelly Gardner - .331 batting average, .398 slugging percentage in 66 games
 First baseman Jim Brown - .319 batting average, .478 slugging percentage, five home runs, 50 RBIs in 72 games
 Left fielder Sandy Thompson - .318 batting average, .394 slugging percentage, 44 RBIs in 75 games

The team's leading pitchers were Willie Foster (13–4, 1.63 ERA, 108 strikeouts), George Harney (12–6, 1.91 ERA), and Reuben Currie (10–4, 3.38 ERA).

References

1926 in sports in Illinois
Negro league baseball seasons